A chef is a professional cook and tradesman who is proficient in all aspects of food preparation, often focusing on a particular cuisine. The word "chef" is derived from the term , the director or head of a kitchen. Chefs can receive formal training from an institution, as well as by apprenticing with an experienced chef.

There are different terms that use the word chef in their titles, and deal with specific areas of food preparation. Examples include the sous-chef, who acts as the second-in-command in a kitchen, and the chef de partie, who handles a specific area of production. The kitchen brigade system is a hierarchy found in restaurants and hotels employing extensive staff, many of which use the word "chef" in their titles. Underneath the chefs are the kitchen assistants. A chef's standard uniform includes a hat (called a toque), neckerchief, double-breasted jacket, apron and sturdy shoes (that may include steel or plastic toe-caps).

Etymology
The word "chef" is derived (and shortened) from the term chef de cuisine, the director or head of a kitchen. (The French word comes from Latin caput (head) and is cognate with English "chief"). In English, the title "chef" in the culinary profession originated in the haute cuisine of the 19th century. The culinary arts, among other aspects of the French language, introduced French loan words into the English language. The word is often used by itself as an honorific to address a chef by each other, apprentices, and waiting staff.

Titles

Various titles, detailed below, are given to those working in a professional kitchen and each can be considered a title for a type of chef. Many of the titles are based on the brigade de cuisine (or brigade system) documented by Auguste Escoffier, while others have a more general meaning depending on the individual kitchen.

Chef de cuisine

Other names include executive chef, chef manager, head chef, and master chef. This person is in charge of all activities related to the kitchen, which usually includes menu creation, management of kitchen staff, ordering and purchasing of inventory, controlling raw material costs and plating design. Chef de cuisine is the traditional French term from which the English word chef is derived. Head chef is often used to designate someone with the same duties as an executive chef, but there is usually someone in charge of a head chef, possibly making the larger executive decisions such as the direction of menu, the final authority in staff management decisions, and so on. This is often the case for executive chefs with multiple restaurants. Involved in checking the sensory evaluation of dishes after preparation and they are well aware of each sensory property of those specific dishes.

In the UK, the title executive chef normally applies to hotels with multi outlets in the same hotel. Other establishments in the UK tend to use the title head chef.

Sous-chef

The sous-chef de cuisine (under-chef of the kitchen) is the second-in-command and direct assistant of the chef de cuisine or head chef. This person may be responsible for scheduling the kitchen staff or substituting when the head chef is absent. Also, the sous-chef will fill in for or assist a chef de partie (line cook) when needed. This person is accountable for the kitchen's inventory, cleanliness, organization, and the continuing training of its entire staff. A sous-chef's duties can also include carrying out the head chef's directives, conducting line checks, and overseeing the timely rotation of all food products. Smaller operations may not have a sous-chef, while larger operations may have more than one.

Chef de partie

A chef de partie, also known as a "station chef" or "line cook", is in charge of a particular area of production. In large kitchens, each chef de partie might have several cooks or assistants. In most kitchens, however, the chef de partie is the only worker in that department.  Line cooks are often divided into a hierarchy of their own, starting with "first cook", then "second cook", and so on as needed.

Commis (chef) / Range chef 

A commis is a basic chef in larger kitchens who works under a chef de partie to learn the station's or range's responsibilities and operation. This may be a chef who has recently completed formal culinary training or is still undergoing training.

Brigade system titles

Station-chef titles which are part of the brigade system include:

Kitchen assistant
Kitchen assistants are of two types, kitchen-hands and stewards/ kitchen porters. Kitchen-hands assist with basic food preparation tasks under the chef's direction. They carry out relatively unskilled tasks such as peeling potatoes and washing salad. Stewards/ kitchen porters are involved in the scullery, washing up and general cleaning duties. In a smaller kitchen, these duties may be incorporated.

A communard is in charge of preparing the meal for the staff during a shift. This meal is often referred to as the staff or family meal.

The escuelerie (from 15th century French and a cognate of the English "scullery"), or the more modern plongeur or dishwasher, is the keeper of dishes, having charge of dishes and keeping the kitchen clean. A common humorous title for this role in some modern kitchens is "chef de plonge" or "head dishwasher".

Culinary education

Education is available from many culinary institutions offering diploma, associate, and bachelor's degree programs in culinary arts. Depending on the level of education, this can take one to four years. An internship is often part of the curriculum. Regardless of the education received, most professional kitchens follow the apprenticeship system, and most new cooks will start at a lower-level 2nd or 1st cook position and work their way up. 

Like many skilled trades, chefs usually go through a formal apprenticeship which includes many years of on-the-job training. Culinary schools and restaurants offer these apprenticeships. To become an apprentice, one must be at least 18 years old and have a high school diploma or GED. Apprenticeships usually take 3 to 4 years to complete and combine classroom instruction with on-the-job training. The training period for a chef is generally four years as an apprentice. A newly qualified chef is advanced or more commonly a toquecommis-chef, consisting of first-year commis, second-year commis, and so on. The rate of pay is usually in accordance with the chefs. Like all other chefs except the executive-chef, trainees are placed in sections of the kitchen (e.g., the starter (appetizer) or entrée sections) under the guidance of a demi-chef de partie and are given relatively basic tasks. Ideally, over time, a commis will spend a certain period in each section of the kitchen to learn the basics. Unaided, a commis may work on the vegetable station of a kitchen.

The usual formal training period for a chef is two to four years in catering college. They often spend the summer in work placements. In some cases this is modified to 'day-release' courses; a chef will work full-time in a kitchen as an apprentice and then would have allocated days off to attend catering college. These courses can last between one and three years. In the UK, most Chefs are trained in the workplace, with most doing a formal NVQ level 2 or 3 in the workplace.

Uniform
The standard uniform for a chef includes a hat called a toque, necktie, double-breasted jacket, apron and shoes with steel or plastic toe-caps. A chef's hat was originally designed as a tall rippled hat called a Dodin Bouffant or more commonly a toque. 

Neckties were originally worn to allow for the mopping of sweat from the face, but as this is now against health regulations, they are largely decorative. The chef's neck tie was originally worn on the inside of the jacket to stop sweat from running from the face and neck down the body. The jacket is usually white to show off the chef's cleanliness and repel heat, and is double-breasted to prevent serious injuries from burns and scalds. The double breast also serves to conceal stains on the jacket as one side can be rebuttoned over the other, which is common practice.

An apron is worn just below knee-length, also to assist in the prevention of burns because of spillage. If hot liquid is spilled onto it, the apron can be quickly removed to minimize burns and scalds. Shoes and clogs are hard-wearing and with a steel-top cap to prevent injury from falling objects or knives. According to some hygiene regulations, jewelry is not allowed apart from wedding bands and religious jewelry. If wound dressings are required they should be blue—an unusual colour for foodstuffs—so that they are noticeable if they fall into food. Facial hair and longer hair are often required to be netted, or trimmed, for food safety. Bandages on the hands are usually covered with nylon gloves. Latex is not typically used for food preparation due to latex allergy.

See also

 American Culinary Federation
 Auguste Escoffier
 Brigade de cuisine
 Culinary art
 Celebrity chef
 Development chef
 List of chefs
 List of pastry chefs
 List of restaurant terminology
 Personal chef
 World Association of Chefs Societies
 Chef (2014 film)

Notes

References

External links

 Official certification levels of the American Culinary Federation
 Chef training and career progression in New Zealand

 
Culinary terminology
Food services occupations
Restaurant staff
Restaurant terminology